Steve Boyum (born September 4, 1952) is a long-time Hollywood stunt performer, television director, and film director. He has appeared in over 60 films as a stunt performer. He has lived in Malibu, California since 1974.

Selected filmography

Director
 Meet the Deedles (1998)
 Johnny Tsunami (1999)
 Mom's Got a Date with a Vampire (2000)
 Stepsister from Planet Weird (2000)
 Motocrossed (2001)
 Slap Shot 2: Breaking the Ice (2002)
 Timecop 2: The Berlin Decision (2003)
 King Solomon's Mines (2004)
 La Femme Musketeer (2004)
 Supercross (2005)
 Supernatural (2006–2016)
 Numbers (2007–2009)
 NCIS: Los Angeles (2009)
 Human Target (2010–2011)
 Hawaii Five-0 (2011–2013)
 Castle (2011)
 Revolution (2012–2014)
 Forever (2014)
 Black Sails (2015–2017)
 Rush Hour (2016)
 Lethal Weapon (2016–2018)
 Blood & Treasure (2019)
 The Boys (2020)

Stunt performer
 Apocalypse Now (1979)
 The Blues Brothers (1980)
 Lethal Weapon 2 (1989)
 Patriot Games (1992)
 True Romance (1993)
 True Lies (1994)
 Mr. Holland's Opus (1995)
 You, Me and Dupree (2006)

Actor
 Rollerball (1975) - Biker (uncredited)
 Zero to Sixty (1978)
 Herbie Goes Bananas (1980) - Panama Policeman
 Predator (1987) - Hostage Executed by the Russian (uncredited)

References

External links
 
 

1952 births
American stunt performers
Living people
American television directors
Male actors from Palm Springs, California
Action film directors
Film directors from Los Angeles